David Lythgoe (born c.1880) was an American silent film actor of the early period. He is best known for his work between 1912 and 1915 in short film under the directorship of Tom Ricketts.

He starred alongside prominent actors of the early period such as Charlotte Burton, William Garwood, Vivian Rich, Harry von Meter and Louise Lester in films such as She Never Knew, The Echo and The Two Sentences.

Selected filmography
At the Edge of Things (1915)
The Altar of Ambition (1915)
In the Sunlight (1915)
The Poet of the Peaks (1915)
She Walketh Alone (1915)
The Day of Reckoning (1915)
In the Heart of the Woods (1915)
The Two Sentences (1915)
The Echo (1915)
She Never Knew (1915)

External links

1880s births
Year of death missing
American male silent film actors
20th-century American male actors